Tibor Halgas (26 May 1981 – 4 February 2020) was a Hungarian football player.

References

DVTK website
HLSZ 

1981 births
2020 deaths
Footballers from Budapest
Hungarian footballers
Association football midfielders
Ferencvárosi TC footballers
Lombard-Pápa TFC footballers
Celldömölki VSE footballers
Diósgyőri VTK players
Fehérvár FC players
Soroksári TE footballers
BKV Előre SC footballers
Kazincbarcikai SC footballers
Road incident deaths in Hungary